Stars Shine International is a record music company in Hong Kong, formed in 2010.

History
Established in 2010, the company started with Jade Kwan, Fala Chen and Joyce Cheng.  Of the three initial artists, only the latter remain.

On March 3, 2011, Alfred Hui joined. June 28, 2011 Cilla Kung joined. November 21, 2011 Linda Chung joined.

On October 20, 2012, Elanne Kong joined

List of Stars Shine International artists

Alfred Hui
Hubert Wu
Kay Tse
Joyce Cheng
Jinny Ng
Cilla Kung
Linda Chung
Super Girls

References

Record labels established in 2010
Pop record labels